The Rocking Tenor Sax of Eddie Chamblee is an album by saxophonist Eddie Chamblee which was recorded in 1963 and released on the Prestige label.

Reception

The Allmusic site awarded the album 4 stars, stating "The Rocking Tenor Sax of Eddie Chamblee finds him blowing with a leering, bump-and-grind swagger more ideally suited to a roadhouse strip joint than an uptown jazz club... it's not without good reason that the cover spells out "Rocking" entirely in capital letters".

Track listing 
All compositions by Eddie Chamblee except as noted
 "The Honeydripper" (Joe Liggins) - 3:08  
 "You'll Never Walk Alone" (Oscar Hammerstein II, Richard Rodgers) - 4:24  
 "Softly, as I Leave You" (Antonio De Vita) - 4:03  
 "Bye Bye Blackbird" (Mort Dixon, Ray Henderson) - 4:27  
 "Champin'" - 2:39  
 "Skang!" - 6:05  
 "Soon" (George Gershwin, Ira Gershwin) - 3:11  
 "Little Things Mean a Lot" (Edith Lindeman, Carl Stutz) - 3:32

Personnel 
Eddie Chamblee - tenor saxophone
Dayton Selby - organ
Al Griffin - drums

References 

Eddie Chamblee albums
1964 albums
Prestige Records albums
Albums produced by Ozzie Cadena
Albums recorded at Van Gelder Studio